is a Japanese manga series written and illustrated by Masami Tsuda. It was serialized in LaLa from 1996 to 2005 and collected in 21 tankōbon volumes by Hakusensha. It depicts the romance between "perfect" student Yukino Miyazawa and her academic rival Soichiro Arima, and the relationships of several of their friends.

The series is licensed and was published in English in North America by Tokyopop. The chapters from the first seven volumes were adapted into a 26-episode anime television series by Gainax and J.C.Staff. Directed by Hideaki Anno, the episodes were broadcast in Japan on TV Tokyo from October 1998 to March 1999. It is licensed for distribution outside of Japan by Enoki Films under the title Tales at North Hills High, and sub-licensed for distribution in North America by Nozomi Entertainment who released it as His and Her Circumstances.

Plot

Yukino Miyazawa is a Japanese high school first-year student who is the envy of classmates for her good grades and immaculate appearance. However, her "perfect" exterior is a façade, an egocentric charade she maintains to win praise. In the privacy of her own home, she is spoiled, stubborn, a slob, and studies relentlessly and obsessively to maintain her grades. On entering high school, she is knocked from her position at the top of the class by Soichiro Arima, a handsome young man whose very existence Yukino considers a threat to the praise on which she thrives, and she vows to destroy him. When Soichiro confesses that he has a crush on her, Yukino rejects him then boasts about it at home. Her observant little sister Kano points out that her rivalry with him comes from admiration, causing her to rethink her own feelings.

Before she can figure out if she hates or likes Soichiro, he visits her home and discovers her being herself. He uses the information to blackmail her into doing his student council work. At first Yukino accepts it, coming to realize that he is also not the perfect student he pretends to be. Tired of being used, Yukino revolts and Soichiro apologizes, and admits he still loves her and just wanted to spend time with her. Yukino realizes she loves him as well, and together they resolve to abandon their fake ways and be true to themselves, though she initially has trouble breaking her lifelong habit of pretend-perfection and her competitive ways.

As the series progresses, Yukino is able to open her true self to others and earns her first real friends beyond Soichiro. It is eventually revealed that Soichiro was striving to be perfect in order to avoid turning "bad" like the parents who abandoned him. Falling in love with Yukino, he is able to become more true to himself, but he also finds himself becoming increasingly jealous of Yukino's change bringing new friends and new activities into her life, and of her having parts of her life that don't involve him. When Yukino unknowingly hurts him, he becomes even more jealous and afraid, and begins to wear another façade of the "perfect boyfriend" in an effort to protect her from his "ugly" self.

The return of both of his parents into his life sends Soichiro into a dark area, but helps him finally break free to truly be himself as Yukino and their friends help him learn to lean on and trust others. The end of the series shows Yukino and Soichiro in their 30s, with their three children, and gives updates on the various friends they made along the way.

Production

Kare Kano was Masami Tsuda's first lengthy manga series. Still new to professional manga writing in general, shortly after starting the series she had to put it on hold while she finished working out the framework of the story and where she ultimately wanted it to go.

In adapting the first seven volumes into an anime television series, director Hideaki Anno kept the same general scenes and dialogue but modified the overall feel and focus of the series, making it into a "personal case study of relationships." He emphasizes the dialog over the animation using a variety of techniques, including iconic scenes, production sketches, real-life location shots, repeated imagery, and even using animation versions of manga panels or simply printing the lines of the dialog being spoken over static screens.

Anno is credited as director for the first 16 episodes and co-director with Hiroki Sato for later episodes but with his name written in katakana as  possibly as a form of protest. Kare Kano would be the last anime series that Anno would direct for Gainax. Michael S. Johnson of Nausicaa.net reports having heard from Gainax staff member that Anno objected to the restrictions placed on television anime by TV Tokyo after the Pokémon seizure incident. In an interview Hiroyuki Yamaga claimed that Gainax found it difficult to work with a series that is based on an original work stating

Media

Manga

Written by Masami Tsuda, Kare Kano was first serialized in LaLa between February 1996 and June 2005. The 101 individual chapters, referred to as "Acts", were compiled into 21 tankōbon volumes by Hakusensha. The first volume was released on June 5, 1996, with the final volume released on August 5, 2005. It also had a one-shot published on June 23, 2011.

Kare Kano was initially licensed for an English language release by Mixx Entertainment in 2000, but it subsequently lost those rights before publication began. In July 2001, the company's Tokyopop division announced that it had reacquired the license and that it would be serializing the title in their Smile magazine starting in 2002. However, Smile was discontinued in 2002 before the Tokyopop released the first collected volume of the series on January 21, 2003; the final volume was released on January 10, 2007. It was one of the first manga series that Tokyopop released in the original Japanese orientation, in which the book is read from right to left, and with the original sound effects left in place. In February 2008, Tokyopop reissued the first three volumes in a single omnibus volume.

The series is licensed for regional language releases by Editions Tonkam in France by Grupo Editorial Vid in Mexico, by Glènat España in Spain, by Dynamic Italia in Italy, by Carlsen Comics in Germany, by Panini Comics in Brazil, and by Planet Manga in Portugal. The chapters were also serialized in the French magazine  and the German magazine Daisuki.

Anime
Kare Kano was adapted as an anime television series produced by Gainax and J.C.Staff. The series was directed by Hideaki Anno. The 26 episodes were broadcast on TV Tokyo from October 1998 to March 1999. The opening theme was "Tenshi no Yubikiri" by Fukuda Mai, and the ending themes were "Yume no Naka e" by Atsuko Enomoto & Chihiro Suzuki for episodes 1–24 and 26 and "Kaze Hiita Yoru" by Yuki Watanabe & Maria Yamamoto for episode 25.

Soundtracks
Four CD soundtracks have been released in Japan for the anime series by the StarChild label of Japan's King Records. The first,  contained 24 tracks, including musical scores by Shirō Sagisu and songs written by Fumiya Fujii and Yōsui Inoue. It was released in Japan on December 23, 1998; Geneon released the CD in the US on January 20, 2004. , containing an additional 25 tracks, followed in Japan on February 26, 1999 and in the US on November 1, 2005. The third volume, also contained 25 tracks. It was released in Japan on May 28, 1999. The three CDs were released as a box set in Japan, along with a fourth disc containing an additional 22 tracks, on February 23, 2005.

Reception
Overall reviews for the series have been positive. The tenth volume of the series was listed as the top selling graphic novel in Japan on October 31, 2000. In The Anime Encyclopedia: A Guide to Japanese Animation Since 1917, Jonathan Clements and Helen McCarthy praised the anime adaptation for its innovative techniques and the use of "surreal 'cartoon' effects." THEM anime reviews gave the anime adaptation a good review calling it "probably the most disarmingly honest shoujo romance ever made." Alexander Harris from Anime News Network called the anime adaptation very character driven, saying "If you love diving into the minds of a character and searching for those juicy naughty bits, and all the while being entertained and educated, then this is for you."

Notes

References

Further reading

External links
 Official Gainax Kareshi Kanojo no Jijō anime site 
 

1996 manga
1998 anime television series debuts
Anime composed by Shirō Sagisu
Gainax
Hakusensha franchises
Hakusensha manga
J.C.Staff
Muse Communication
Romantic comedy anime and manga
School life in anime and manga
Shōjo manga
Tokyopop titles
TV Tokyo original programming